Hinke is a unisex given name and a surname. Notable people with the name are as follows:

Given name
 Hinke Bergegren (1861–1936) , Swedish politician
 Hinke Osinga (born 1969), Dutch mathematician

Surname
 Gustav Hinke (1844–1893), German oboist

Unisex given names
Surnames of German origin